Connecticut elected its members April 12, 1827, after the term began but before the new Congress convened.

See also 
 1826 and 1827 United States House of Representatives elections
 List of United States representatives from Connecticut

Notes

References 

 

1827
Connecticut
United States House of Representatives